The list of ship commissionings in 1981 includes a chronological list of all ships commissioned in 1981.


See also 

1981